Qədirli (also, Kadirli and Kadyrly) is a village and municipality in the Tovuz Rayon of Azerbaijan.  It has a population of 1,469.

References 

Populated places in Tovuz District